Banabona is a village in the Kotli District of Azad Kashmir, Pakistan.  Neighbouring settlements include Bindian, Majwal and Marhota.

References

Populated places in Kotli District